Pascal Hungerbühler (born 22 February 1977) is a Swiss former professional road cyclist.

Major results
2003
 8th Tour du Jura
 10th Overall UNIQA Classic
2004
 1st Rund um den Flughafen Köln-Bonn
 6th Overall Bayern–Rundfahrt
2005
 10th Overall Tour of Austria
2006
 8th GP du canton d'Argovie
 10h Overall Bayern–Rundfahrt
2007
 3rd Overall Tour of Hainan
 5th Road race, National Road Championships
 10th GP du canton d'Argovie

References

External links

1977 births
Living people
Swiss male cyclists
Cyclists from Zürich